The NA62 experiment (known as P-326 at the stage of proposal) is a fixed-target particle physics experiment in the North Area of the SPS accelerator at CERN. The experiment was approved in February 2007. Data taking began in 2015, and the experiment is expected to become the first in the world to probe the decays of the charged kaon with probabilities down to 10−12. The experiment's spokesperson is Cristina Lazzeroni (since January 2019). The collaboration involves 333 individuals from 30 institutions and 13 countries around the world.

Goals
The experiment is designed to conduct precision tests of the Standard Model by studying rare decays of charged kaons. The principal goal, for which the design has been optimized, is the measurement of the rate of the  ultra-rare decay  with a precision of 10%, by detecting about 100 decay candidates with a low background. This will lead to the determination of the  CKM matrix element |Vtd| with a precision better than 10%. This element relates very accurately the likelihood that top quarks decay to down quarks. The Particle Data Group's 2008 Review of Particle Physics lists |Vtd| = . A broad program of studies of kaon physics is run in parallel including studies of other rare decays, searches for forbidden decays and for new exotic particles not predicted by the standard model (for example Dark Photons).

Experimental Apparatus 
In order to achieve the desired precision, the NA62 experiment requires a certain level of background rejection with respect to signal strength. Namely, high-resolution timing (to support a high-rate environment), kinematic rejection (involving the cutting on the square of the missing mass of the observed particles in the decay with respect to the incident kaon vector), particle identification, hermetic vetoing of photons out to large angles and of muons within the acceptance, and redundancy of information.

Due to these necessities, the NA62 experiment has constructed a detector which is approximately 270 m in length. The components of the experiment are explained briefly below, for full details see 

.

Beam Line 
The foundation of the NA62 experiment is observing the decays of kaons. In order to do this, the experiment receives two beams from the SPS,

The Primary Beam, called P42, is used for the production of the K+ beam. The 400 GeV/c proton beam is split into three branches and strikes three targets (T2, T4, and T6). This produces beams of secondary particles which are directed through the underground target tunnel (TCC2). At the exit of T4, the beam of transmitted protons passes through apertures in two vertically-motorized beam-dump/collimator modules, TAX 1 and TAX 2 for P42, in which holes of different apertures define the angular acceptance of the beam and hence allow the flux of protons to be selected over a wide range. In order to protect the components of the apparatus, a computer surveillance program allows the currents in the principle magnets along the P42 beam line to be monitored and to close Tax 2 in case of error.

A secondary beam line, K12HIKA+, is kaon beam line. This beam is designed to come from a high flux of 400GeV/c protons in the North Area High Intensity Facility. The target/beam tunnel, TCC8, and the cavern, ECN3, where the detectors of experiment NA48 have been installed, have a combined length of 270m. It is planned to reuse the existing target station, T10, (located 15m from the beginning of TCC8), and to install the secondary beam along the existing (straight) K12 beam line, of length 102m to the exit of the final collimator, which marks the beginning of the decay fiducial region and points to the NA48 detectors (notably the liquid krypton electro-magnetic calorimeter, LKR).

These beams lead to 4.5 MHz of kaon decays in the fiducial region with a ration of ~6% for K+ decays per Hadron Flux.

Cedar/KTAG 
The KTAG is the 'kaon tagger', designed to identify  particles within the unseparated hadron beam. This detector is a differential Cherenkov counter (CERN west-area Cedar), instrumented with a bespoke detector consisting of 8 arrays of photodetectors (KTAG)

.

GigaTracker (GTK) 
Placed immediately before the decay region of the kaons, the GTK is designed to measure the time, direction, and momentum of all the beam tracks. The GTK is a spectrometer and can provide the measurement from the incoming 75 GeV/c kaon beam. The measurements of the GTK are used for decay selections and for background reduction.

The GTK is composed of three different stations labeled GTK1, GTK2, and GTK3 based on the order in which they are found relative to the beam path. They are mounted around four achromat magnets (which are used to deflect the beam). The entire system is placed along the beam line and is inside the vacuum tank.

CHANTI 
This charged anti-counter detector (CHANTI) is primarily designed to veto events with inelastic interactions between beam particles and the GTK3. The detector is constructed from six planes of scintillator detectors surrounding the beam.

Straw Tracker 
The kaon beam passes through the upstream region and into the decay region, a roughly 60 m long region inside a large vacuum vessel, after which the decay products are detected in the straw tracker stations. The system measures the direction and the momentum of secondary charged particles which come from the decay region. This spectrometer is made with four chambers intersected with a high aperture dipole magnet. Each of the chambers consists of multiple straw tubes positioned to offer four views to give four coordinates. Out of 7168 straws in the whole system, only one was flawed. The leaking straw was sealed and the detector operated normally during the 2015 run.

Photon Veto Systems 
The experiment has a photon veto system that provides hermetic coverage between 0 and 50 milliradians. This system is made up of several subsystems covering different angular ranges; the Large Angle Vetos (LAVs) cover 8.5 -- 50 mrad, the Liquid Krypton Calorimeter (LKr) covering 1-8.5 mrad and the Small Angle Vetos (SAV) covering 0-1 mrad.

Large Angle Vetos (LAV) 
The 12 LAV stations are constructed from four or five annular rings of lead glass scintillator detectors surrounding the decay volume. The first 11 stations are operated in the same vacuum tank as the decay volume and STRAW while the final chamber (LAV12) is positioned after the RICH and operated in air.

Small Angle Vetos (SAV), Intermediate Ring Calorimeter (IRC) and Small Angle Calorimeter (SAC) 
The IRC and SAC are electromagnetic sampling calorimeters constructed from alternating layers of lead and plastic scintillators. The SAC is positioned at the very end of the experimental apparatus in line with the beam path but after the charged particles are bent away and sent into the beam dump. This means any photons traveling along the beam direction down to 0 angle can be detected.

Liquid Krypton Calorimeter (LKr) 
The LKr detector is re-used from NA48 with upgraded readout systems. The active material of the calorimeter is liquid krypton. Electromagnetic showers, initiated by charged particles or photons, are detected via ionisation electrons which drift to anodes positioned inside the liquid krypton. The signals are amplified and distributed to the readout systems.

Ring Imaging Cherenkov Detector (RICH) 
The RICH is designed to distinguish between pions and muons for particles of momentum between 15 and 35 GeV/c. It is constructed from a 17.5 m long vessel with diameter up to 4.2 m and filled with nitrogen gas (at about 990 mbar). As charged particles pass through the gas Cherenkov photons are emitted at a fixed angle determined by the momentum and mass of the particle and the pressure of the nitrogen gas. Photons are reflected from an array of mirrors at the downstream end of the RICH and detected in two arrays of photomultiplier tube detectors at the upstream end of the vessel.

Charged Hodoscopes (NA48-CHOD & CHOD) 
The CHOD detectors are scintillator detectors which provide input to the trigger system detecting charged particles. The system is formed from the NA48-CHOD detector, re-used from the NA48 experiment and formed from 2 planes of scintillating bars arranged vertically and horizontally, and the newly constructed CHOD constructed from an array of scintillator tiles read out by Silicon photomultipliers.

Hadronic Calorimeters (MUV1 & MUV2) 
The MUV1 and MUV2 are sampling hadronic calorimeters formed from alternating layers of iron and scintillators. The newly constructed MUV1 has fine transverse segmentation to separate electromagnetic and hadronic components of showers and the MUV2 is re-used from NA48.

Muon Veto Detector (MUV3) 
The MUV3 is constructed from a plane of scintillator tiles, reach read out by a pair of photomultipliers, and positioned behind an 80 cm iron wall which blocks particles leaving only muons to be detected. This detector provides a fast muon veto at trigger level and is used to identify muons at analysis level.

Data 
The experiment has run multiple tests to ensure that the new detector components were working properly. The first physics run with a nearly complete detector took place in 2015. NA62 collected data in 2016, 2017 and 2018 before the CERN Long Shut Down 2. Data analysis is ongoing and several results are in preparation.

As part of the experiment, several papers have been, and are in the process of being created. A list of published papers for the NA62 experiment can be found here.

Results



2016 Data 
Results published:

.

2017 Data 
Results first presented at KAON19 conference.

Forbidden  Decays

(Lepton Number Violation) 
Results published:

Exotics

Heavy Neutral Lepton 
Results published:

Dark Photon 
Results published:

See also
NA48 experiment
CERN NA62 Home
NA62 Website
NA62 and NA48 published papers

References

Further reading

External links
NA62 website
NA62 CERN
CERN-NA-062 experiment record on INSPIRE-HEP

Particle experiments
CERN experiments
Fixed-target experiments